ČAFC Prague is a Czech football club located in Prague-Záběhlice. It currently plays in the Prague Championship, which is in the fifth tier of the Czech football system. It is one of the oldest football clubs in the country. ČAFC played in the highest division of football in Czechoslovakia in the 1920s, taking part in the inaugural national league, the 1925 Czechoslovak First League.

Historical names
 1899 – 1918 ČAFC Královské Vinohrady
 1918 – 1948 ČAFC Vinohrady
 1948 – 1950 Sokol ČAFC Vinohrady
 1951 – 1952 Instalační závody ČAFC
 1952 – 1953 Tatran Stavomontáže B
 1953 – 1968 Tatran Pozemní stavby
 1968 – 1979 ČAFC Praha
 1979 – 1990 Tatran Stavební závody
 1990 – ČAFC Praha

References

External links
 Official website 
 ČAFC Prague at the website of the Prague Football Association 

CAFC
Czechoslovak First League clubs
Association football clubs established in 1899
Football clubs in Austria-Hungary